Banja is a village in the municipality of Priboj, Serbia. According to the 2002 census, the village has a population of 2163 people. It is the location of Banja Monastery.

References

Populated places in Zlatibor District